Melanoromintho is a genus of tachinid flies in the family Tachinidae.

Species
Melanoromintho barbiellinii Townsend, 1935

Distribution
Brazil.

References

Exoristinae
Diptera of South America
Tachinidae genera
Taxa named by Charles Henry Tyler Townsend
Monotypic Brachycera genera